The Rosablanche is a mountain of the Swiss Pennine Alps, overlooking the Lac des Dix in the canton of Valais. It lies on the range between the valleys of Bagnes (west) and Hérémence (east), north of Le Pleureur.

Climbing routes
The normal routes from the north side are from Barage de la Grande Dixence (Dix lake) in Val d’ Heremence, and from Siviez in Val de Nendaz, with the car access in both cases. From the Siviez side there is bus service as well. These are non-technical but very attractive glacier routes. There are some crevasses, so you will need crampons and other things for glacier tours. For both directions plan around 5 hours to get to the summit.

The route from the south starts in the Fionnay valley (Val de Bagnes) and it is snow-free in summer time.

The huts
There are several huts around and you can use them as your start points. From the Fionnay side there is Cabane de Louvie in Val de Bagnes.  From the north-east side you have Cabane de Prafleuri at 2624 m above the sea level, Cabane de Ecoulaies at 2575 m, and Ref. de la Barmaz at 2458 m. From the Siviez side you have Ref. de St. Laurent at 2485 m.

References

External links
Rosablanche on Hikr
Rosablanche on Summitpost
Rosablance on Mountains for Everybody

Mountains of the Alps
Alpine three-thousanders
Mountains of Valais
Bagnes
Mountains of Switzerland